The Hoo is a large detached house in the Hampstead area of the London Borough of Camden. An early design in the Queen Anne style by the architect Horace Field, it was built 1888–90 and altered 1987–88. It is a Grade II listed building.

The English Heritage listing describes its style as an "Irregular composition in Domestic Revival style, much influenced by Norman Shaw". The house faces south at a right angle to Lyndhurst Gardens. The eastern flank of the house has a tall chimney and a broad gable. The house is built of red brick, with tile-hanging features on the upper storey. The casement windows are built partly of stone and timber, with leaded lights. The tiled roofs have overhanging eaves. The interior retains many original features, with original panelling, plasterwork, door surrounds and fireplaces. The original staircase has been retained, along with dados, and a built-in window seat with chests of draws.

Field later designed several houses in nearby Lyndhurst Road, this time in a Neo-Georgian style.

The house is now occupied by the Belsize, Gospel Oak and West Hampstead Community Health Teams, part of the Royal Free London NHS Foundation Trust. It is also the site of the archives of the Royal Free Hospital. Fleet Counselling, who offer affordable one-on-one counselling services are also based in the building.

In 2019 the building was sold by Savills on behalf of the Royal Free NHS Foundation Trust, having failed to sell at auction on 26 November the previous year. A planning and listed building application for conversion to three houses is now being considered by the London Borough of Camden

See also
 Healthcare in London

References

Houses completed in 1890
Grade II listed houses in the London Borough of Camden
Horace Field buildings
Houses in Hampstead
Health in the London Borough of Camden